Skyss is the public authority that plans, purchases and markets the public transport services governed by the county authority in Vestland, Norway. Skyss does not have a board, but is governed by the county council. Skyss was established in 2007 and is responsible for public transport in Vestland (former Hordaland), covering bus, light rail (“Bybanen”), boat and ferry. Contracts for the operation of bus/boat/light rail routes are awarded to private traffic companies after tender competitions managed by Skyss.

The total budget for 2014 is approximately NOK 2 000 million. Total income (ticket revenue) is approximately NOK 800 million. The gap between costs and income is covered by public funds.

Skyss has since the establishment in 2007 conducted a major reform within public transport in Hordaland (now Vestland). Achievements include the commencement of the Bergen Light Rail in 2010 and several major route changes to optimize public transport in areas and corridors where there are most travellers. The changes have led to a significant growth in passenger numbers.

Skyss introduced a new ticketing system in 2010, and in 2013 introduced an additional solution for smartphone tickets.

References

Public transport administrators of Norway
Companies owned by municipalities of Norway
County-owned companies of Norway
Public transport in Hordaland
2007 establishments in Norway
Hordaland County Municipality